The College of Physicians and Surgeons of Costa Rica  is a professional body responsible for the audit of medicine and surgery in the Republic of Costa Rica. All doctors in the country must be affiliated with it in order to practice the profession legally in Costa Rica. In addition, technicians in different medical fields are incorporated into the institution.

Their offices are located in Sabana Sur, San José de Costa Rica. The present chairman is Mainor Vargas, a specialist in pathology.

External links
Official website of the College of Physicians and Surgeons of Costa Rica

Institutions of Costa Rica